Lauren Simmons (born August 11, 1994) is an American producer, writer, and former stock trader for Rosenblatt Securities. On March 6, 2017, at age 22, she became the youngest and only current full-time female trader at the New York Stock Exchange. She also became the second African American woman in the Exchange's 228-year history to have such a position.  Simmons left Wall Street in December 2018.

She was named to Ebony's Power 100 list in 2018, and was also awarded 2018 Women of Impact by Politico.

Life and career 
Simmons was raised in Marietta, Georgia. She received her bachelor's degree in genetics from Kennesaw State University in 2016 with plans to pursue a career in genetic counseling. However, she decided instead to move to New York City and once there she met Richard Rosenblatt through networking.

Simmons gained prominence in 2017 at age 22, after she took a job at Rosenblatt Securities and became the youngest and only woman trader on the New York Stock Exchange. She is also the second African American woman in history to have that position. During her time as a full-time equity trader she earned $120,000 per year. She left the position in December 2018, and cited exclusion by her coworkers after she received press coverage as one of her reasons for leaving.

She is the co-executive producer on a forthcoming biographical film about her life, starring and co-produced with Kiersey Clemons for AGC Studios.

As of 2021, Simmons is the host and producer of the upcoming web series Going Public, which helps viewers invest in companies that are preparing to release an IPO. She is  an advocate for the financial sector to take steps to increase diversity and inclusion. Simmons is writing a book about personal finance.

References

External links
 Official Instagram

1994 births
Living people
African-American people
American stock traders
People from Georgia (U.S. state)
Kennesaw State University alumni
People from Marietta, Georgia
21st-century African-American women
21st-century African-American people
American finance and investment writers
American women television producers
Television producers from Georgia (U.S. state)
Women stock traders